Susan Peretz (March 2, 1940 – August 27, 2004) was an American actress who performed in television and film. She starred for one season in the television series Babes and appeared in an episode each of TV's Barney Miller and Married... With Children. She appeared in the films Dog Day Afternoon, Melvin and Howard, and Honkytonk Man, among other film and television projects.

Early life and career
Born in New York City, Peretz later graduated from SUNY Buffalo in Buffalo, NY. She began her acting career after joining the Actors Studio, where she later served on its executive board. She also founded and taught acting at the Third Street Theatre in Los Angeles between 1989 and 2002.

For one season, she starred in the television series Babes, along with Wendie Jo Sperber and Lesley Boone. Some of her other television appearances included episodes of ER, Murder, She Wrote, Married... with Children, L.A. Law, and Cagney & Lacey.

Death
Peretz died of breast cancer on August 27, 2004 in Los Angeles.

Filmography
Hurry Up, or I'll Be 30 (1973) as Audition Girl #2 (Miss Walsh)
Dog Day Afternoon (1975) as Angela "Angie" Wortzik
American Raspberry (1977) as Heather
Melvin and Howard (1980) as Chapel Owner
Barney Miller (1981) as Norma Griswald
In the Custody of Strangers (1982) as Big Faye
Honkytonk Man (1982) as Miss Maud
Swing Shift (1984) as Edith
Oh, God! You Devil (1984) as Louise
Poltergeist II: The Other Side (1986) as Daughter
Retribution (1987) as Mrs. Stoller
Sing (1989) as Mrs. Tucci
Loose Cannons (1990) as Lady Tenant
Married... With Children (1993) as Ms. Blaub
Life Happens (1996) as Sarah
Fallen Arches (1998) as Marie
You Are So Going to Hell! (2004) as Grace
Break a Leg (2005) as Acting Teacher

References

External links
 
 
 Susan Peretz at Internet Off-Broadway Database
 

1940 births
2004 deaths
Actresses from New York City
American film actresses
American television actresses
Deaths from cancer in California
Deaths from breast cancer
People from Greater Los Angeles
University at Buffalo alumni
20th-century American actresses
21st-century American actresses